Michael Clyde Gallagher (born 1943) is an American academic administrator. He is a former President of Mesa State College now Colorado Mesa University in Grand Junction, Colorado. Gallagher later served as interim President of Idaho State University.  He also previously had served as President of the University of Houston-Victoria and as Dean of Business there.

Gallagher is a professor of business administration. He earned his B.B.A. from Southwest Texas State University (now Texas State University–San Marcos). His M.B.A. and Ph.D. are from Texas A&M University.

Gallagher was Vice President of Academic Affairs at Idaho State in the early and mid-1990s. He left in 1996 to become president at Mesa State, serving in that capacity until 2003. In the 70s and 80s he served as Director of the Small Business Institute at Southwest Texas State University, taught (1977–79) in the Troy State University MBA program in Europe, and was Chairman of the Department of Management at the University of Arkansas-Little Rock.

In October 2005 Gallagher returned to Idaho State to serve as interim president upon the retirement of Richard L. Bowen. He served as the university's president for the remainder of the 2005-06 school year while a search for a permanent replacement was conducted. In the Fall of 2006 Gallagher was succeeded by Dr. Arthur C. Vailas.

After leaving Idaho State Gallagher returned to Mesa State, where he taught international business until his retirement in 2010.

Preceding his career in education, Gallagher worked in management positions at Phillips Petroleum Company and Procter & Gamble and served in the U.S. Air Force (1961–65) as a Cryptographer.

References
http://www.boardofed.idaho.gov/press_releases/2005PressReleases/10_11_05.asp
https://web.archive.org/web/20060528101220/http://www.mesastate.edu/president/pastpres.htm

Presidents of Idaho State University
Colorado Mesa University
Living people
1943 births